Ole Siggaard-Andersen (10 Dec 1932 - ) is a Danish  physician clinical chemist who elucidated much acid base physiology. He jointly invented the concepts of base excess and standard base excess.

His doctoral thesis, The Acid-Base Status of the Blood, was published as a book for five editions and in five languages. He was honored by the American Association for Clinical Chemistry who awarded him the Edwin F. Ullman Award in 2003.

References

1932 births
Living people
Danish medical researchers
Acid–base chemistry
Clinical chemists